Minuscule 418 (in the Gregory-Aland numbering), ε 504 (in the Soden numbering), is a Greek minuscule manuscript of the New Testament, on paper. Palaeographically it has been assigned to the 14th century. 
It has marginalia.

Description 

The codex contains the text of the Gospel of Matthew and Gospel of Mark on 120 paper leaves with lacunae. The text is written in two columns per page, in 17-20 lines per page. It has many errors of itacism.

There is also a division according to the smaller Ammonian Sections (no references to the Eusebian Canons).

Contents: Matthew and Mark 1:1-13:32. Probably the manuscript was never finished.

Text 

The Greek text of the codex is a representative of the Byzantine text-type. Aland placed it in Category V.

In Matthew 6:13 it has doxology in the Lord's Prayer in this version: 
ὅτι σοῦ ἐστιν ἡ βασιλεία καὶ ἡ δύναμις καὶ ἡ δόξα, τοῦ πατρὸς καὶ τοῦ υἱοῦ καὶ τοῦ ἁγίου πνεύματος εἰς τοὺς αἰῶνας. ἀμήν (For thine is the kingdom and the power and the glory, of the Father and of the Son and of the Holy Spirit for ever. Amen.)
This ending appears in only two other manuscripts: 157 and 225.

History 

The manuscript was added to the list of New Testament manuscripts by Scholz (1794-1852).
C. R. Gregory saw it in 1886.

The manuscript is currently housed at the Biblioteca Marciana (Gr. I. 28) in Venice.

See also 

 List of New Testament minuscules
 Biblical manuscript
 Textual criticism

References

Further reading 

 

Greek New Testament minuscules
14th-century biblical manuscripts